Kevin J. Sullivan (born 1959) is an American politician who served as Mayor of Lawrence, Massachusetts from 1986 to 1993, Massachusetts Secretary of Transportation from 1999 to 2002, and Massachusetts Secretary of Administration and Finance from 2002 to 2003.

Since 2003, Sullivan has worked for Santander Bank. He is currently Santander's Director of Government Banking. From 2009 to 2011 he was a member of the state Inspector General's Council.

Family
He is the brother of former Lawrence Mayor Michael J. Sullivan.

References

1959 births
Mayors of Lawrence, Massachusetts
Massachusetts Secretaries of Transportation
People from Merrimac, Massachusetts
University of Massachusetts Lowell alumni
Massachusetts Democrats
Massachusetts Republicans
Living people
Date of birth missing (living people)
Massachusetts Secretaries of Administration and Finance